Chloe Angeline Stickney Hall (November 1, 1830 – July 3, 1892) was an American mathematician and suffragist who was the wife of astronomer Asaph Hall. Stickney Hall was an active participant in her husband's search for the moons of Mars, performing mathematical calculations on the data he collected.

Early life
Angeline Stickney was born to Theophilus Stickney and Electa Cook on November 1, 1830. In 1847 she took three terms of study funded by her cousin, Harriette Downs, at Rodman Union Seminary. Stickney was able to attend New-York Central College with help from her sister Ruth and by teaching at the college. She majored in science and mathematics, doing coursework in calculus and mathematical astronomy, and graduated with the college's first class, in 1855. New-York Central College was a progressive school where students of modest means, including women and free African Americans, could earn a college degree. It was here that she became passionate about the causes of women's suffrage and the abolition of slavery.

Angeline Stickney and Asaph Hall met at Central College. Stickney was two years ahead of Hall. She was his instructor in geometry and German. During their days together as teacher and student, Hall and his classmates would devise questions and problems that they were convinced Stickney could not solve, yet she reportedly never failed to solve them.

Marriage and astronomy
Stickney and Hall married in Elkhorn, Wisconsin, on March 31, 1856. As was common at the time, she had to give up her academic career after the wedding. Immediately after the wedding, the couple moved to Ann Arbor, Michigan, so that Hall could continue his education at the University of Michigan. Three months later, they moved to Shalersville, Ohio. It was Stickney who communicated with her husband's employer, Captain Gillis, and successfully suggested that he should be made a professor at the Naval Observatory.

She encouraged him to continue his search for satellites of Mars when he was ready to give up, and he successfully discovered the moons Phobos and Deimos. However, when she asked for payment equal to a man's salary for her calculations, Asaph refused, so Angeline then discontinued her work.

Personal life
Hall home-schooled all four of her children, and all attended Harvard University. Her third son, Angelo Hall, a Unitarian minister, wrote her biography. Her oldest son, Asaph Hall, Jr., was born on October 6, 1859, and served as director of the Detroit Observatory from 1892 to 1905.  Other sons were named Samuel (second son) and Percival (fourth son); Percival Hall (1872–1953) was the second president of Gallaudet University from 1910 to 1946 (he himself was not deaf).

She died at North Andover, Massachusetts, at age 61. The largest crater on Phobos, Stickney Crater, is named after her.

Further reading

References

1830 births
1892 deaths
People associated with astronomy
American suffragists
American abolitionists
19th-century American mathematicians
American women mathematicians
19th-century American women scientists
People from Georgetown (Washington, D.C.)
New York Central College faculty
New York Central College alumni
Women civil rights activists